Rosana Serrano (born 17 July 1998) is a Cuban rower.

Serrano competed at the Pan American Games where she won a bronze medal in the Lightweight double sculls event alongside Milena Venega.

References

1998 births
Living people
Cuban female rowers
Rowers at the 2019 Pan American Games
Pan American Games medalists in rowing
Pan American Games bronze medalists for Cuba
Medalists at the 2019 Pan American Games
21st-century Cuban women